Sovlanut is an album by Jamie Saft which was released on the Tzadik label in 2000.

Reception

In his review for Allmusic, Tom Benton notes that "Despite the presence of ubiquitous downtowners Chris Speed and Jim Black, Sovlanut is not exactly a grand avant-jazz masterpiece, but instead a challenging expedition into live electronica, as Jewish and Arabic themes are arranged over a dense backdrop of dub and drum'n'bass. Though there certainly is bountiful improvising to be had, Sovlanut seems more focused on exploring similar atmospheric territory as the club music by which it was inspired".

Track listing
All compositions by Jamie Saft
 "Kasha Dub" – 6:54  
 "Sovlanut" – 12:52  
 "Mach / Hey" – 15:06  
 "Midwood Cowboy" – 3:43  
 "Tefachim" – 11:53  
 "Fresser Dub" – 2:55

Personnel
Jamie Saft – piano, Hammond organ, synthesizer, guitar, bass, saz, percussion
Chris Speed – clarinet 
Jonathan Maron – bass 
Jim Black, Chris Kelly (tracks 1 & 6) – drums, percussion 
Rick Quinones – vocals (tracks 1 & 6)

References

Tzadik Records albums
Jamie Saft albums
2000 albums